The Montgomery County Courthouse, located in Courthouse Square in Hillsboro, is the county courthouse serving Montgomery County, Illinois. While the courthouse was originally built in 1833–35, it did not attain its current form until an extensive remodeling in 1868–71. Architect Gurdon P. Randall designed the remodeled courthouse in the Second Empire style. The courthouse's design features two towers: a square tower enclosing a staircase at the southwest corner, and a tower with a mansard roof at the southeast corner. The courthouse's cornice, which runs along the roof line and the bottom of the mansard roof, features decorative brackets. Since the renovated courthouse reopened, it has continuously served as the seat of county government functions.

The courthouse was added to the National Register of Historic Places on October 28, 1994.

References

Courthouses on the National Register of Historic Places in Illinois
Second Empire architecture in Illinois
Buildings and structures in Montgomery County, Illinois
County courthouses in Illinois
Government buildings completed in 1871
National Register of Historic Places in Montgomery County, Illinois